Microneura is a genus of dragonfly in the family Protoneuridae. It contains the following species:
 Microneura caligata

Protoneuridae
Taxonomy articles created by Polbot